The National Defence University of Malaysia (abbreviated as NDUM or UPNM) is a military university located in Sungai Besi Camp, Kuala Lumpur, Malaysia. 

The university is Malaysia's first catering to the needs and development of the Malaysian Armed Forces. 

There are around 2,700 undergraduate students, with over 890 of them Officer Cadets that undergo four to five years of training.

History
UPNM was originally Akademi Tentera Malaysia (ATMA), or the Malaysian Armed Forces Academy, which was established on 1 June 1995. It was an organisation that offered bachelor's degrees in the fields of engineering, sciences and managements, with military training.

The bachelor's degree courses were accredited and awarded by Universiti Teknologi Malaysia in the beginning. The lecturers came from within the armed forces, some hired by the academy and the rest deputised by UTM.

On 10 November 2006, ATMA was upgraded to university status creating the current UPNM. The establishment of the university was announced by the Prime Minister Datuk Seri Abdullah Ahmad Badawi during the Budget 2007 reading in the Malaysian Parliament. The setting up of the university cost RM 500 million and was fully borne by the Government of Malaysia.

The university's first intake of students was for the 2007/2008 session.

Campus

Location
UPNM's main campus is at the Sungai Besi Camp in Kuala Lumpur. The campus was completed in 2002 as part of ATMA.

Chancellory
The former Commandant of ATMA, Lt. General Dato' Wira Ir. Ismail Samion was appointed as the first vice-chancellor of UPNM. His appointment created history in the Malaysian higher education scene as the first military personnel appointed to be vice-chancellor of a local university. Ismail was Commandant of ATMA for six years prior to the appointment.

The current Vice-Chancellor is Lt Jen Dato' Abdul Halim Jalal who appointed to the post in 2018.

 ATMA Commandants/UPNM Vice-Chancellor
      
   Lt Jen Dato' Ismail Hassan               1995 - 1996      
   Mej Jen Dato' Abd Ghani Yunus              1996 - 1997      
   Brig Jen Baharudin Abdul Kadir             1997 - 1997      
   Brig Jen Dato' Adenan Mohamad Zain            1998 -      
   Brig Jen Azizan Ariffin            -      
   Lt Jen Dato' Wira Ir. Ismail Samion (VC)            2002 - 2008      
   Lt Jen Dato Pahlawan Hj Zulkifli Zainal Abidin (VC)   2008 - 2010      
   Lt Jen Dato' Wira Allatif bin Mohamed Noor (VC)      2010 - 2013      
   Jen Tan Sri Hj Zulkifli Zainal Abidin (VC)            2013–2018      
   Lt Jen Dato' Abdul Halim Jalal                     2018–2021
   Lt Jen Dato’ Hasagaya Bin Abdullah                 2021- Present
    
 ATMA/UPNM Commanding Officers (CO)

   Lt Kol Badrulzaman Abd Rani           1995 - 1996
   Lt Kol Azroie Ahmad      1996 - 1997
   Lt Kol Mohammad Azudin Othman Fuad   1997 - 1998
   Kol Mohd Shukuri Ahmad      1998 - 2004
   Lt Kol          2004 - 2005
   Lt Kol Ahmad Sazali Sukardi     2005 - 2006
   Lt Kol Zakaria borhan      2006 - 2009
   Lt Kol Abdul Aziz Ismail                          2009 - 2010
   Lt Kol Kamal Idris Johari     2010 - 2011
   Lt Kol Chan Weng Poh             2011 - 2013
   Lt Kol Wan Azni bin Hj Wan Muhammad            2013–Present

Curriculum
Cadets are educated and graded on their performance in academics, physical fitness, and military leadership.

The academic program consists of a core of 11 courses balanced in management, sciences and engineering. Cadets choose their courses in the end of their foundation year.

The physical program includes physical education classes and competitive athletics. Every cadet participates in an intercollegiate, club or intramural (called Inter-Battalion Sports) level sport each year.  As with all soldiers in the Armed Forces, cadets also must pass a physical fitness test (UKA) twice per year. Additionally, during each end year-session, cadets must undergo Single Service Training (LKPT)—which generally is regarded by cadets to be the "worst 6 weeks of the year."

Cadets learn military skills, including leadership, through a military program (LKU) that begins on their first day at the university. Most military training takes place during the end-semester holiday, with new cadets undergoing Cadet Basic Training (LFI) — or "Square bashing".  Additionally, cadets are housed in barracks style floor-by-floor management at accommodation blocks and have leadership positions and responsibilities throughout the academic year.

Every mid-semester, the young men and women train at the campus camp; campus fields for physical trainings, 1RAMD obstacle course and shooting range for obstacle course exercise and shooting practice, and RMC's parade ground for drills. In this six-week part of LKU at the campus, the cadets are introduced to a basic firearms and training exercises. The battalions are in command of appointed rank holders and final year cadets. The super-seniors are in officer positions such as Platoon leader and Company commanders. At the end of the six-week UKMHK session, awards are given out to the best battalion based on the best performance at each training site.

Moral-ethical development occurs throughout the formal programs. These include formal instruction in the values of the military profession, religious programs, and interaction with staff and faculty role models. The foundation of the ethical code at the university is found in the institution's motto, "Duty, Honor, Integrity." Cadets adhere to the Cadet Honor Code, which states "A cadet will not lie, cheat, steal, or tolerate those who do."

Programme

Academic programme

Language Centre
 Language and Cross Culture Communication

Defence Engineering Faculty
 Civil engineering
 Electric & Electronic (Power) engineering
 Electric & Electronic (Communication) engineering
 Mechanical engineering
 Mechanical - Automotive engineering
 Mechanical - Aeronautic engineering
 Mechanical - Marine technology engineering
 Art defence engineering

Defence Sciences Faculty
 Computer science (Security system)
 Computer science (Artificial intelligence)
 Maritime technology

Faculty of Defence Management Studies
 Defence human resource management
 Strategic studies
 Security and defence management

Faculty of Medicine and Defence Health Sciences
 Bachelor of Medicine

Rank
Unlike virtually all other bachelor-degree granting institutions in Malaysia (but like the other military academies in Malaysia), the university does not refer to its students as freshmen, sophomores, juniors, or seniors; they are instead called by their year of intake e.g. "2002", "2003", "2004", "20XX".

Colloquially, the freshmen are "tahun asas (basic year)"; sophomores, "tahun satu (year 1)";  juniors, "tahun dua (year 2)";  seniors,  "tahun tiga (year 3)"; super-senior, "tahun empat (year 4)". Most cadets consider basic year to be the most difficult because of the rules and restrictions developed to help students transition from civilian to military cadet. However, the third and fourth years are generally considered to be the hardest academically.

Within the university, cadets who reached year three or four can hold positions of increasing responsibility with a cadet rank: 
 Cadet: Member of platoon - year 1 to year 4 cadet.
 Cadet Corporal: - year 1 to year 4 cadet.
 Cadet Sergeant: Leader of a platoon - year 3 and year 4 cadet.
 Cadet CSM (KSM): Cadet Company Sergeant Major. Second in charge of a company - year 3 and year 4 cadet.
 Cadet JUO (PRM): Cadet Junior Under Officer. Leading a company/second in charge of a battalion - year 3 and year 4 cadet.
 Cadet SUO (PRK): Cadet Senior Under Officer. Leading a battalion or the cadet brigade - year 4 cadet.

Organization

In the UPNM student organisation, they are divided by two which is Student Representative Council or Majlis Perwakilan Pelajar (consist of military and civilian students) and also
rank holder and cadet mess secretariat.
see the website of SRC UPNM - *National Defence University of Malaysia Students Representative Council

The cadets have the following organisation:
(The number of cadets is approximate and varies year to year)
 1 brigade (1,500 cadets) which consists of:
 4 battalions
 9 companies (120 cadets) which each company consist of:
 3 platoons (40 cadets)

There are 9 companies in the Cadet Brigade and these are as follows:
 Hang Tuah 
 Hang Jebat 
 Hang Kasturi 
 Hang Lekir 
 Hang Lekiu  
 Tun Perak
 Hang Nadim
 Tun Teja
 A Company Zulu Battalion

Except 'Zulu', each of the companies of the 3 battalions are named after legendary heroes of Malay folklore. Each battalion has their own identity such as insignia, emblem, motto, song and war dance. Every cadet holds their battalion's pride in high spirit which can be seen during inter-battalion sports or military competition. The Hang Lekiu battalion is the battalion for foundation/basic year cadets, who are living with their own intake for a year before reporting to any one of the battalions as first year cadets. Zulu Battalion is the battalion for final year cadets prior to their commissioning. A cadet will leave their battalion to join Zulu after a batch of previous Zulu have been commissioned, usually in January.

Admission
Admission to the university is by applying through the Education Ministry's University Central Unit where academic qualification will be evaluated. Candidates then undergo physical, mental and leadership tests for a period of 1–3 weeks which is conducted by the Ministry of Defence.

Admissions requirements
To be admitted, candidates must be between 18 and 20 years old upon entrance for the foundation level, not be married, and have no legal obligation to support a child, and be of good moral character.  The process includes a university application, standardised testing, and personal references.  Candidates for admission have a physical aptitude test as well as a complete physical exam, including a separate visual acuity test to be eligible for appointment, although medical waivers are available.  Usually, candidates with vision uncorrectable to 20/20, as well as a range of other injuries or illnesses, will be automatically considered for a medical waiver only if they are highly competitive.

Graduation
The military graduates of the NDUM receive a bachelor's degree and are commissioned as young officers in the Army or equivalent rank in the navy or air force with an obligation to serve 10 years active service in the military. Eligibility for particular specialties (infantry, artillery, armour, engineers, etc.) is determined by academic performance and personal preference. A cadet is a first class graduate if he or she has earned a 3.70 or above Accumulated Grade Pointer Average (CPA), second class if 3.0-3.69 or third class if 2.99 and below. Each of these new officers receives their new shoulder boards in the presence of the Yang di-Pertuan Agong, the commander in chief of the MAF. The civilian graduates, who also receive degrees, are guaranteed employment in private and public sector firms.

See also 
 List of Universities in Malaysia

References

External links 

 UPNM website
 Malaysian Armed Forces website
 National Defence University of Malaysia Students Representative Council

Universities and colleges in Kuala Lumpur
Public universities in Malaysia
Military academies
Educational institutions established in 1995
1995 establishments in Malaysia
Military academies of Malaysia